Aleksander Andrzej Skiba (26 February 1945 – 7 September 2000) was a Polish volleyball player and coach, a member of the Poland national team from 1967 to 1976, and the 1974 World Champion.

Personal life
Skiba was born in Rokitów, Poland. After finishing his career, he lived in Italy, where he died suddenly on 7 September 2000.

Honours

As a player
 National championships
 1965/1966  Polish Championship, with AZS AWF Warsaw
 1968/1969  Polish Championship, with Legia Warsaw
 1969/1970  Polish Championship, with Legia Warsaw

As a coach
 CEV European Champions Cup
  1977/1978 – with Płomień Milowice
  1985/1986 – with Santal Parma
 National championships
 1976/1977  Polish Championship, with Płomień Milowice
 1978/1979  Polish Championship, with Płomień Milowice

External links
 
 
 Coach profile at LegaVolley.it 
 Coach/Player profile at Volleybox.net

1945 births
2000 deaths
People from Biłgoraj County
Polish men's volleyball players
Polish volleyball coaches
Volleyball coaches of international teams
Olympic volleyball players of Poland
Volleyball players at the 1968 Summer Olympics
Polish expatriate sportspeople in Italy
Legia Warsaw (volleyball) players